Machavaram may refer to the following places in India:

 Machavaram, Guntur district, Andhra Pradesh
 Machavaram, Medak, Telangana
 Machavaram, Amalapuram, East Godavari